Daniel Douglas Jilek (December 3, 1953 – March 6, 2002) was an American football player. He played professional football as a linebacker for the Buffalo Bills from 1976 to 1979.  He was drafted by the Bills in the fourth round, as the 109th overall pick in the 1976 NFL Draft.  As a rookie in 1976, he started 14 games for the Bills, intercepted two passes, recovered three fumbles and was the Bills' rookie of the year.

Jilek starred as a high school football, basketball and baseball player for Utica Stevenson in Michigan from 1969 to 1972 and college football for the University of Michigan from 1972 to 1975.  He was selected as an All-Big Ten Conference player in both 1974 and 1975.  He was also selected as an Academic All-American.

After retiring from football, Jilek operated an insurance company

A 5k fun/run is held each fall to honor Dan Jilek's memory and to support his commitment to improve youth via athletics.

Notes

External links
Pro-Football reference

1953 births
Buffalo Bills players
Sportspeople from Cedar Rapids, Iowa
Michigan Wolverines football players
2002 deaths